John Tuttle (born November 16, 1958) is an American long-distance runner. He finished third in the Olympic Marathon Trial in Buffalo, New York on May 26, 1984. He then competed in the marathon at the 1984 Summer Olympics.

References

External links
 

1958 births
Living people
Athletes (track and field) at the 1984 Summer Olympics
American male long-distance runners
American male marathon runners
Olympic track and field athletes of the United States
People from Alfred, New York
Track and field athletes from New York (state)
20th-century American people